Deborah Bampton, MBE, (born 7 October 1961) is an English former international footballer who played as a midfielder. During her career Bampton won a treble at Arsenal and two doubles with Croydon. She also was capped a sum of 95 times for England, scoring seven goals all in all.

Bampton was appointed an MBE in 1998 as a recognition of her services to women's football.
She also went on to be inducted into the English Football Hall of Fame in 2005.

Club career
Bampton began her career at the age of 14. She played for Lowestoft Ladies F.C., the team winning the Women's FA Cup in 1928, although Bampton missed the final due to injury.  She then moved to captain Howbury Grange, managed by her father Albert. She was a member of the side that won the Women's FA Cup in 1984. In 1987 she moved to Italy, playing for Despar Trani 80 as a full–time professional alongside compatriot Kerry Davis. She spent just one season there, but won runners–up medals in both the Serie A and national Cup.

She joined Arsenal Ladies in 1992. Bampton thereafter won with Arsenal the treble of League Cup, Premier League and FA Cup in that being her first season at the club. Her following 1993–94 season was without fruit in comparison to prior. With this being so, in 1994 Bampton left Highbury to become player-manager of Croydon Women. In 1995–96, Croydon won the League title and the FA Women's Cup. Despite leaving the field after eight minutes due to injury, Bampton won her fifth FA Cup winners' medal when Croydon beat Liverpool in the 1996 final at the New Den. She won the league with Croydon twice more before leaving to join Doncaster Belles as a player in 2000 after the Croydon club moved to Charlton.

In 2004, she joined Eastbourne Borough Ladies FC, a team her father Albert was coaching. During their first season as a women's team they went on to win the Sussex County Cup and the League Cup,

She joined the coaching staff of Whitehawk Ladies in the 2006 close season, along with former Arsenal and England player Angela Banks. In February 2008, she was manager of Whitehawk Ladies. Bampton joined the coaching staff of Lewes FC Ladies in January 2009.

International career
Bampton made her England debut whilst still at school, playing against the Netherlands in September 1978.

Bampton hit the winning goal in Denmark as England qualified for the 1984 European Competition for Women's Football final. In the second leg of the final at Kenilworth Road, Bampton scored in England's penalty shootout defeat to Sweden. In 1985 she became the England captain following the retirement of Carol Thomas, then England's most capped player and still the second longest serving captain.  In 1991 she was injured and replaced as captain by Gillian Coultard. In 1995 new manager Ted Copeland restored her as captain, and she led the Three Lionesses into their first ever FIFA Women's World Cup appearance that year. Bampton recalled: "It was difficult, especially as Gill and I were roommates and at that point the England squad was split. A lot of people wanted Clare Taylor to be captain, but it was something I'd always wanted to do and so I just enjoyed it." She retained the captaincy for England's failed 1997 UEFA Women's Championship qualification campaign. In May 1997 Bampton made her final England appearance in a 6–0 friendly defeat to United States in Portland.
She won 95 caps for England, scoring three goals altogether.

Playing style
Bampton was a tall, strong and industrious central midfielder. She characterised herself as "a box-to-box player" and said "I worked hard to win the ball, and I was always looking to make forward runs. I was not a natural goalscorer, but I did look to set up chances for others."

Personal life
Bampton is a fan of a men's club, Arsenal

Honours

Club
Lowestoft
FA Women's Cup: 1982 WFA Cup Final

Howbury Grange
FA Women's Cup: 1984 WFA Cup Final

Millwall
FA Women's Cup: 1991 WFA Cup Final

Arsenal
WSL Cup: 1993
Women's Premier League: 1993
FA Women's Cup: 1993

Croydon
Women's Premier League: 1996, 1999, 2000
WSL Cup: 1996, 2000

Individual
English Football Hall of Fame: 2005

References

External links

1961 births
Living people
English women's footballers
Members of the Order of the British Empire
English Football Hall of Fame inductees
England women's international footballers
Arsenal W.F.C. players
Charlton Athletic W.F.C. players
Doncaster Rovers Belles L.F.C. players
Lowestoft Ladies F.C. players
Millwall Lionesses L.F.C. players
FA Women's National League players
1995 FIFA Women's World Cup players
Expatriate women's footballers in Italy
English expatriate women's footballers
Serie A (women's football) players
A.C.F. Trani 80 players
English women's football managers
Women's association football midfielders